The Giro di Toscana is a road bicycle race held annually in Tuscany, Italy. From 2005 to 2014, the race has been organised as a 1.1 event on the UCI Europe Tour. The race was not held in 2015. On 4 April 2016 it was announced that the race will return in September 2016 as a three-race challenge (similar to the Trittico Lombardo or Vuelta a Mallorca), consisting in three one-day races held consecutively in Tuscany. Each race will award points to the best placed riders, and the rider who score most points will win the overall classification of Giro della Toscana. This new edition will be named Giro della Toscana – Memorial Alfredo Martini, in memory of Alfredo Martini, former cyclist and coach of the Italy national cycling team.

Winners

References

External links
Official site

See also
 Giro della Toscana Int. Femminile – Memorial Michela Fanini

UCI Europe Tour races
Cycle races in Italy
Recurring sporting events established in 1923
1923 establishments in Italy